The HAL-3 is an airborne navigation radar developed by the Shanghai Institute of Electron Physics originally for the Y-10 programme. Development started in June 1980 and was completed in February 1985 and it has been extensively tested on the Boeing 707 and Y-7. The overall technical characteristics are thought to be similar to the Bendix AN/APS-133/RDR-1F.

Specifications
Range: 
air-to-ground mode : 240km
air-to-air mode: 15km
 Output power:　50kW
 Power consumption:　800W
 Weight:　9999kg

External links
The HAL-3 radar test set - Aerospace and Electronic Systems, IEEE 1994

Aircraft radars